John McGahern (12 November 1934 – 30 March 2006) was an Irish writer and novelist. He is regarded as one of the most important writers of the latter half of the twentieth century.

Known for the detailed dissection of Irish life found in works such as The Barracks, The Dark and Amongst Women, he was hailed by The Observer as "the greatest living Irish novelist"  and in its obituary The Guardian described him as "arguably the most important Irish novelist since Samuel Beckett".

Biography
Born in Knockanroe about half a mile from Ballinamore, County Leitrim, John McGahern was the eldest child of seven. He was raised alongside his six young siblings on a small farm in Knockanroe. McGahern's mother ran the farm (with some local help) whilst maintaining a job as a primary-school teacher in the local school. His father, a Garda sergeant, lived in the Garda barracks at Cootehall in County Roscommon, distant from his family. McGahern's mother died of cancer in 1944, when John was 10, resulting in the uprooting of the McGahern children to their new home with their father in the Cootehall Garda barracks.

In the years following from his mother's death, McGahern completed his primary schooling in the local primary school, and ultimately won a scholarship to the Presentation Brothers secondary school in Carrick-on-Shannon. Having travelled daily to complete his second-level education, McGahern continued to accumulate academic accolades by winning the county scholarship in his Leaving Certificate enabling him to continue his education to third level.

McGahern was offered a place at St Patrick's College of Education in Drumcondra where he trained to be a teacher.  Upon graduation he began his career as a primary schoolteacher at Scoil Eoin Báiste (Belgrove) primary school in Clontarf where, for a period, he taught the academic Declan Kiberd. He returned to third-level education in University College Dublin where he graduated in 1957. He was dismissed from Scoil Eoin Báiste on the order of the Archbishop of Dublin, John Charles McQuaid. He was first published by the London literary and arts review, X, which published in 1961 an extract from his first – abandoned – novel, The End or Beginning of Love.

McGahern married his first wife, Finnish-born Annikki Laaksi, in 1965 and in the same year published his second novel, The Dark which was banned by the Irish Censorship Board for its alleged pornographic content along with its implied sexual abuse by the protagonist's father. Due to the controversy which was stirred by the book's publication McGahern was dismissed from his teaching post and forced to move to England where he worked in a variety of jobs, including on building sites, before returning to Ireland to live and work on a small farm near Fenagh in County Leitrim.

He died from cancer in the Mater Hospital in Dublin on 30 March 2006, aged 71. He is buried in St Patrick's Church Aughawillan alongside his mother.

Novels
McGahern's six novels, drawing inspiration from personal life experience, detail the trials of developing a sense of self in mid-twentieth century Ireland.

The early novels: The Barracks and The Dark
His first published novel, The Barracks (1963), chronicles the life of the barracks' Garda sergeant's second wife, Elizabeth Reegan, who is in declining health due to cancer. The Barracks was adapted for the stage in 1969 by Hugh Leonard.

His second book, The Dark (1965), tracks the progression of a young boy as he moves through the education system in rural Ireland. The main character, young Mahoney, while maintaining his academic prowess experiences a strained relationship with his father, old Mahoney – who beats him and the other children – as well as indecision about what to do with his life after secondary school. Young Mahoney's attitude towards his father evolves over the large timespan covered within the novel from fear and hatred towards greater acceptance.

Note: The Barracks and The Dark came from McGahern's re-writing of his first, unpublished, novel, The End or Beginning of Love.

Mid-career literature: The Leavetaking and The Pornographer
The next novel, The Leavetaking (1975) introduces the reader to Patrick Moran, a young schoolteacher in Dublin. The novel is set during his last day in the school. He will be formally fired that night for having married a divorced non-Catholic woman during a leave of absence year. The novel is divided into two parts: both of which are essentially flashbacks. Part 1 covers the teacher's childhood up to the moment of his mother's death. Like McGahern himself, Patrick had promised his mother that he would become a priest and, as he is unable or unwilling to do so, instead becomes a schoolteacher (often referred to as "the second priesthood" in mid-twentieth century Ireland). Part 2 flashes back to how he came to meet his wife, how exactly the church authorities fire him, and his ultimate dismissal by the church authorities, the formal authority within Irish schools at the time. The book is a close reflection on McGahern's own experience of being dismissed from his teaching post in the early 1960s for much the same reasons as Patrick Moran, as well as the scandal caused by his second book, The Dark, for its many sexual references.

The Pornographer (published in 1979) details the life of the novel's protagonist who lives in Dublin and writes pornography for a living. He begins a sexual relationship with a young woman called Josephine, and when Josephine subsequently becomes pregnant, the "pornographer" voices his contempt towards the birth of the baby, and indeed his relationship with the child's mother. As with McGahern's previous novel, this work treats the subject of death by cancer – the protagonist's aunt in this case is dying in hospital – as well as visits to rural Ireland.

Back to the country: Amongst Women and  That They May Face the Rising Sun (By The Lake)
His fifth and perhaps McGahern's best known novel is Amongst Women (1990) which marks a return to the Roscommon/Leitrim setting after two Dublin/London books. It details the story of Michael Moran, an IRA veteran of the Irish War of Independence and the Irish Civil War, who now dominates his family in the unforgiving farmlands of County Leitrim, near Mohill. The book shows a detailed and understanding portrayal of a hardened, and unapologetically idealistic protagonist in the figure of an ageing Moran. An ex-IRA commander, Moran detests the "small-minded gangsters" who now run the country for which he fought. Though Moran's presence surely dominates the novel, the positive attributes of his stern moralism and sense of self-worth are passed on to his children, who become successful adults (both emotionally and financially) in both Dublin and London alike. Once again, it seems to fit into a sequence, with the progressive male character most closely reflected by Luke, who left home, emigrated to London, and refuses to get close his father again. One may view McGahern's portrayal of the Moran household as the house he left behind with the remaining kids being brought up by his father, his father's remarriage, and his young brother's struggles with his father and school. In 2015 the Guardian listed Amongst Women as 97 in its list of the 100 best novels.

His final novel, That They May Face the Rising Sun which was published in 2002 (published in the United States as By the Lake) is a portrait of a year in the life of a rural lakeside community. The novel, explores the meaning in prosaic lives and life in (a now past life) in rural Ireland. He said "the ordinary fascinates me" and "the ordinary is the most precious thing in life". The main characters have – just like McGahern and his wife – returned from London to live on a farm. Most of the violence of the father-figure has disappeared now, and life in the country seems much more relaxed and prosperous than in The Dark, or Amongst Women as McGahern now writes in a twenty-first century Ireland.

Other writing
McGahern is also considered a master of the Irish tradition of the short story. Several collections were published as well as Love of the World, a collection of non-fiction essays. His autobiography, Memoir (All Will be Well: a Memoir in the US), was published in 2005 a year before his death outlining numerous influential moments in his life which critics often speculated were present within his earlier work. Andrew Motion wrote "In a tremendously distinguished career, he has never written more movingly, or with a sharper eye".

Influence
McGahern's work has been very influential in Ireland and elsewhere. A younger generation of Irish writers, such as Colm Tóibín, as well as contemporaries such as Eamonn McGrath, have been influenced by his writing.

His work has been translated into many languages, in particular French.

Awards and honours
McGahern was a member of the Irish Arts honorary organisation Aosdána and won many other awards (including the Chevalier dans l'Ordre des Arts et des Lettres). He was visiting professor at many universities including Colgate University and the University of Notre Dame (United States), University of Victoria (Canada), Durham University (UK), UCD and NUI Galway (Ireland). His other awards included:
1962   AE Memorial Award (Irish Arts Council)
1964   Macauley Fellowship (Irish Arts Council)
1979   FRSL
1985   Irish-American Foundation Award
1990   Irish Times/Aer Lingus Fiction Award
1990   Shortlisted for Man Booker Prize
1991   LittD Trinity College Dublin
1994   LittD University College Galway
1995   
2003   LittD St. Patrick's College, Drumcondra, Dublin
2003   Irish PEN Award
2003   Hughes & Hughes/Irish Novel
2007   National Archive Choice

He was also a farmer, although he liked to joke that it was the writing that kept the farm rather than the farming revenue allowing him to write.

Archives
 List for John McGahern's Literary Archive at National University of Ireland, Galway

List of works
Novels
 The Barracks (1963) AE Memorial Award, McCauley Fellowship.
 The Dark (1965)
 The Leavetaking (1975)
 The Pornographer (1979)
 Amongst Women (1990), Irish Times/Aer Lingus Literary Award (1991), GPA Award (1992), nominated for the Booker Prize (1990).
 That They May Face the Rising Sun (2002), Irish Novel of the Year (2003), nominated for the International Dublin Literary Award. Published in the United States under the title By the Lake (2002)

Non-fiction
 Memoir (2005). Published in the United States in 2006 under the title All Will Be Well.
 Love of the World (2009) Collected non-fiction and essays.

Short story collections
 Nightlines (1970)
 Getting Through (1978)
 The Stoat (1978)
 High Ground (1985)
 The Collected Stories (1992), includes the three previous volumes of short stories (some of the stories appear in a slightly different form) and two additional stories – "The Creamery Manager" and "The Country Funeral". The former first appeared in Krina (1989).
 Creatures of the Earth: New and Selected Stories (2006) contains several stories collected in The Collected Stories, here revised by McGahern for the last time. Again two new stories, "Creatures of the Earth" and "Love of the World", are included.

Drama
 Sinclair (1971) (radio, adaptation of the short story, 'Why We're Here')
 The Barracks (1971) (radio, adaptation of the novel of the same name)
 The Sisters (1971) (television, adaptation of the James Joyce short story of the same name)
 Swallows (1975) (television, adaptation of the short story of the same name)
 The Rockingham Shoot (1987) (television)
 The Power of Darkness (1991) (theatre)

Films
Amongst Women was filmed as a television mini-series in 1998, directed by Tom Cairns, and starring Tony Doyle as Moran.

One of McGahern's best-known short stories, "Korea", was made into a feature film of the same name directed by Cathal Black and produced by Darryl Collins in 1995. In 1996 Korea won the Asta Nielsen Best Film Award at the Copenhagen Film Festival and was runner-up for the Audience Prize at the Seattle Film Festival.

Notes

Further reading 
 
 John McGahern. Love of the World: Essays. Edited by Stanley van der Ziel. Introduction by Declan Kiberd. London: Faber and Faber, 2009.
 
 McGahern's work is discussed and illustrated in the video Reading Ireland: Contemporary Irish Writers in the Context of Place (Educational Media Solutions, 2012, Films Media Group)
 John McGahern: Authority and vision. Edited by Zeljka Doljanin and Máire Doyle. Manchester University Press, 2017. .

External links
 Irish writers online profile
 Portrait of John McGahern
 Picture of John McGahern
 Newsday interview
 Irish quarterly review Interview
 Guardian Interview
 Faber reading guide for Amongst Women
 Faber reading guide for 'That They May Face the Rising Sun'
 Etudes Britanniques Contemporaines, Special Issue on John McGahern
 
 Ireland's Rural Elegist
 John McGahern and the Imagination of Tradition

1934 births
2006 deaths
Alumni of St Patrick's College, Dublin
Aosdána members
Deaths from cancer in the Republic of Ireland
Irish farmers
Irish schoolteachers
Irish male short story writers
People from County Leitrim
Writers from Dublin (city)
20th-century Irish novelists
20th-century Irish male writers
Irish male novelists
21st-century Irish novelists
Irish PEN Award for Literature winners
Saoithe
Fellows of the Royal Society of Literature
20th-century Irish short story writers
21st-century Irish short story writers
21st-century Irish male writers